Silver Lake may refer to:

Cities and towns

Canada
Silver Lake, in Peterborough County, Ontario, a dispersed rural community in the municipality of Trent Lakes
Silver Lake, in Renfrew County, Ontario, a dispersed rural community in the municipality of Bonnechere Valley

United States
:
Silver Lake, Los Angeles, a neighborhood in Los Angeles, California
Silver Lake, San Bernardino County, California, a ghost town
Helendale, California, also known as Silver Lakes
Silver Lake, Florida
Silver Lake, Indiana
Silver Lake, Kansas
Erlanger, Kentucky, previously known as Silver Lake
Silver Lake, Massachusetts, an unincorporated community
Nonantum, Massachusetts, also known as Silver Lake
Silver Lake, Minnesota
Silver Lake, Missouri
Silver Lake, New Hampshire
Silver Lake, Cumberland County, New Jersey
Silver Lake, Essex County, New Jersey
Silver Lake, Warren County, New Jersey
Silver Lake, Otsego County, New York
Silver Lake, Staten Island, New York
Silver Lake, Wyoming County, New York
Silver Lake, Ohio
Silver Lake, Oregon
Silver Lake, Providence, Rhode Island
Silverlake, Texas
Silver Lake, Washington
Silver Lake, Wisconsin, a town
Silver Lake, Waushara County, Wisconsin, an unincorporated community

Lakes
Lago Argentino, literally Silver Lake, near El Calafate, Patagonia
Silver Lake (Kawartha Lakes), Central Ontario, Canada
Silver Lake (Lanark–Frontenac), Eastern Ontario, Canada
Silver Lake (Serbia)

United States

Silver Lake (Amador County), California, a reservoir
Silver Lake (Mojave), California, a dry lake bed
Silver Lake Reservoir, Los Angeles County, California
Silver Lake (Dover, Delaware)
Silver Lake (Milford, Delaware)
Silver Lake (Rehoboth Beach, Delaware)
Silver Lake (Highlands County, Florida)
Silver Lake (Silver Lake, Florida)
Silver Lake (Sumter County, Florida), a lake that is partly in Sumter County and partly in Hernando County
Silver Lake (Blaine County, Idaho)
Silver Lake (Kansas)
Silver Lake (Pittsfield, Massachusetts)
Silver Lake (Plymouth County, Massachusetts)
Silver Lake (Wilmington, Massachusetts)
Silver Lake (Michigan), Index set page of lakes named or previously named Silver Lake in Michigan 
Silver Lake (Grand Traverse County, Michigan)
Silver Lake (Waterford Township, Michigan)
Silver Lake (Clay County, Minnesota)
Silver Lake (Cook County, Minnesota)
Silver Lake (Rochester, Minnesota)
Silver Lake (St. Anthony, Minnesota)
Silver Lake (Stone County, Missouri)
Silver Lake (Harrisville, New Hampshire)
Silver Lake (Hollis, New Hampshire)
Silver Lake (Madison, New Hampshire)
Silver Lake (Bovina, New York)
Silver Lake (Clinton County, New York)
Silver Lake (Delaware County, New York)
Silver Lake (Woodridge, New York)
Silver Lake (Oregon)
Silver Lake (Washington County, Rhode Island)
Silver Lake (Hutchinson County, South Dakota)
Silver Lake (Kingsbury County, South Dakota)
Silver Lake (Miner County, South Dakota)
Silver Lake (North Cascades National Park), Washington
Silver Lake (Oconomowoc, Wisconsin)

Parks
Silver Lake Provincial Park, British Columbia, Canada
Silver Lake Provincial Park (Ontario), Canada
Silver Lake National Wildlife Refuge, North Dakota, United States
Silver Lake State Park (Michigan), United States
Silver Lake State Park (New Hampshire), United States
Silver Lake State Park (New York), United States
Silver Lake State Park (Vermont), United States
Silver Lake Wilderness Area, Adirondack Mountains, New York, United States

Education
Silver Lake College, the name of Holy Family College 1972-2019 in Manitowoc, Wisconsin, United States
Silver Lake Joint School District 1, Wisconsin, United States
Silver Lake Regional High School, Kingston, Massachusetts, United States
Silver Lake USD 372, a school district in the Topeka, Kansas, area

Other uses
Silver Lake (investment firm), a private equity firm based in Menlo Park, California
Silver Lake Air Warning Station, Everett, Washington, United States
Silver Lake Bank, Montrose, Pennsylvania, United States
Silver Lake Dam, a dam in New York
Silver Lake Dam (Michigan), a former dam near Marquette, Michigan, United States
Silver Lake District, a historic district in Harrisville, New Hampshire, United States
Silver Lake Farm, a historic site in Harrisville, New Hampshire, United States
Silver Lake Film Festival, a former film festival in Los Angeles
Silver Lake Forest Service Strip, an airfield in Lake County, Oregon, United States
Silver Lake Mall, Coeur d'Alene, Idaho, United States
Silver Lake Railroad, Madison, New Hampshire, United States
Silver Lake station, a subway station in Belleville, New Jersey
Silver Lake Village, a shopping center in St. Anthony, Minnesota, United States
Der Silbersee or The Silver Lake, a play with music by Kurt Weill
"Silver Lake", a 2011 song by Miss Kittin
Silverlake, the codename for the IBM AS/400 during the development of that system

See also
Silbersee (disambiguation), German for Silver Lake
Silver Lake Township (disambiguation)
 Under the Silver Lake, a 2018 film